Introducing The Beau Brummels is the debut album by American pop rock band the Beau Brummels. It was produced by Sly Stone. Unlike with most other debut albums of the era, ten of the twelve songs on the album are originals. The album peaked at number 24 on the U.S. Top LPs chart in 1965.

Tracks
All songs written by Ron Elliott, except where noted.
Side 1
 "Laugh, Laugh" -  2:54
 "Still in Love With You Baby" -  2:32
 "Just a Little" (Bob Durand, Elliott) - 2:23
 "Just Wait and See" - 2:22
 "Oh Lonesome Me" (Don Gibson) - 2:22
 "Ain't That Loving You Baby" (Deadric Malone) - 2:22
Side 2
"Stick Like Glue" - 1:58
 "They'll Make You Cry" - 3:05
 "That's If You Want Me To" - 2:23
 "I Want More Loving" - 2:23
 "I Would Be Happy" - 2:40
 "Not Too Long Ago" - 3:06

1998 Repertoire bonus tracks
"Good Time Music" (John Sebastian) - 3:05 (A-side)
 "Gentle Wanderin' Ways" - 2:45
 "Fine With Me" - 2:17 (B-side)
 "Just a Little" (Durand, Elliott) - 2:23 (Demo)
 "It's So Nice" - 1:48 (Demo)
 "How Many Times" - 2:07 (Demo)
 "She's My Girl" - 2:28 (Demo)
 "News" - 1:56 (Demo)
 "I'll Tell You" - 2:45 (Outtake from Volume 2)
 "No Lonelier Man" - 2:01 (Demo)
 "She Loves Me" - 3:11 (Demo)
 "Tomorrow Is Another Day" - 2:44 (Demo)

Personnel
Sal Valentino -  vocals
Ron Elliott - lead guitar
Declan Mulligan - guitar
Ron Meagher - bass
John Petersen - drums

Chart performance

References

1965 debut albums
The Beau Brummels albums
Albums produced by Sly Stone
Autumn Records albums